Andrés Enrique Paretti Toledo (born 12 May 1947) is a Chilean former professional footballer who played as a left winger for clubs in Chile and El Salvador.

Career
Paretti joined Universidad Católica after making appearances in a youth championship. In his country of birth, he also played on loan at Universidad Técnica del Estado in the Chilean Segunda División in 1965.

After having chances to play for Huachipato and Universidad Católica, he emigrated to El Salvador and joined Alianza in 1966, winning the first league title for the club in its history. He coincided with his compatriots Miguel Hermosilla and Ricardo Sepúlveda, taking part of the well-known squad nicknamed La Orquesta Alba (The White Orchestra). Then, he played for Luis Ángel Firpo until 1969, leaving the activity at early age due to a knee injury.

After his retirement as a player, he became a football manager thanks to Hernán Carrasco and founded and coached IRA 26, the team of the company where he worked, reaching the Segunda División de El Salvador.

Personal life
He was nicknamed Chico (Little) due to his height.

He made his home in El Salvador and worked for IRA, a milk and grain distribution company, for 23 years. After, he worked for a supermarket and a drugstore.

He married Blanca Lidia Flores and they have two children, Uberlinda and Andrés Jr.

Honours
Alianza
 Salvadoran Primera División:

References

External links
 Andrés Paretti at PlaymakerStats.com

1947 births
Living people
Chilean people of Italian descent
Footballers from Santiago
Chilean footballers
Chilean expatriate footballers
Club Deportivo Universidad Católica footballers
Alianza F.C. footballers
C.D. Luis Ángel Firpo footballers
Chilean Primera División players
Primera B de Chile players
Salvadoran Primera División players
Chilean expatriate sportspeople in El Salvador
Expatriate footballers in El Salvador
Association football forwards
Chilean football managers
Chilean expatriate football managers
Expatriate football managers in El Salvador